The Datsun 17T was a small truck produced in Japan from 1938 until 1944. It was also used by the Japanese armed forces in the Second Sino-Japanese War and in World War II.

Design
The Datsun 17T was almost identical to the preceding Datsun 15T but distinguished by a wider vertical bar in middle of the front grille.

Drivetrain

Production
The Datsun 17T was produced in Yokohama from April 1938 to January 1944 and then resumed after the Second World War in 1949 with a different grille as the Datsun 3135 and with an almost identical grille in 1950 as the Datsun 4146.

References

17T
Rear-wheel-drive vehicles
Nissan trucks
Cars introduced in 1938
1940s cars